Ethyl iodide (also iodoethane) is a colorless flammable chemical compound. It has the chemical formula C2H5I and is prepared by heating ethanol with iodine and phosphorus. On contact with air, especially on the effect of light, it decomposes and turns yellow or reddish from dissolved iodine.

It may also be prepared by reaction between hydroiodic acid and ethanol distilling off the ethyl iodide. Ethyl iodide should be stored in the presence of copper powder to avoid rapid decomposition, though even with this method samples do not last more than 1 year.

Because iodide is a good leaving group, ethyl iodide is an excellent ethylating agent. It is also used as the hydrogen radical promoter.

Production
Ethyl iodide is prepared by using red phosphorus, absolute ethanol and iodine. The iodine dissolves in the ethanol, where it reacts with the solid phosphorus to form phosphorus triiodide.  During this process, the temperature is controlled.

3 C2H5OH + PI3 → 3 C2H5I + H3PO3

The crude product is purified by distillation.

References

Iodoalkanes
Ethylating agents